Abraham Abba Rakowski (November or December 1854 – 1921) was a Galician Hebrew writer, journalist, and translator.

Biography
Rakowski was born in Mariampol, Austrian Galicia, the son of Rabbi Azriel Arye Leib Rakowski of Plotzk. He studied Talmud under his father, and was educated privately in Hebrew and modern languages. From 1872 onward he was a frequent contributor to Hebrew journals, especially Ha-Tzfira.

Among Rakowski's publications were Nidḥe Israel (Warsaw, 1875), a translation of Philippson's novel on the Marranos; Ḥoter mi-geza Ishai (Warsaw, 1880), a translation of Disraeli's romance The Wondrous Tale of Alroy; Ha-nekamah (Warsaw, 1883), a historical narrative; and Masekhet shetarot (1894), a Talmudic parody. He also published numerous works in Naḥum Sokolow's yearly journal Ha-Asif, including Nispe belo mishpat, a historical novel; Leil hitkadesh ḥag ha-Pesaḥ, a story of the Prague ghetto; Ta'alumot ha-mikroskop, a humorous story; Dibrei ḥakhamim, a collection of pithy sayings and citations from world literature; Min ha-metzar, a translation of a story by Auerbach on the Prague ghetto; Ha-kesef, a history of the development of money and of its influence upon culture, political economy, and commerce; Devar Eloheinu yakum le-olam, an epitome of the history of Semitic nations during the Biblical ages; Zaken ve-yeled, a translation from the Polish of Okanski; and Al admat nekhar, a translation of Orzeszkowa's Mirtala.

By 1895 Rakowski had become a prosperous merchant at Zambrov, Russian Poland.

Bibliography

References
 

1854 births
1921 deaths
19th-century Jews
19th-century translators
English–Hebrew translators
Hebrew-language writers
Jews from Galicia (Eastern Europe)
People of the Haskalah
Polish parodists
People from Marijampolė
People from Zambrów
Polish Hebraists
Translators from Polish
Translators to Hebrew